Liga ASOBAL 1997–98 season was the eighth since its establishment. A total of 14 teams (2 less than 1996–97 season) competed this season.

Competition format
This season, the competition format consisted in two phases.

Overall standing

Championship playoff

permanence playoff

In–Out playoff

Frigorificos Morrazo remained in Liga ASOBAL.

Top goal scorers

1997-98
handball
handball
Spain